A Homecoming King is a ceremonial role in student homecoming rallies.

Homecoming King may also refer to:
Hasan Minhaj: Homecoming King, 2017 comedy film
"Homecoming King", song from the Guster album Keep It Together

See also
Homecoming Queen (disambiguation)
Homecoming (disambiguation)